was a Japanese video game developer based in Tokyo. Suzak worked with Nintendo to create games based on their intellectual property, such as Wario: Master of Disguise and F-Zero Climax. They created numerous games for PlayStation 2, Game Boy Advance, and Nintendo DS.

On August 17, 2012, the company filed for bankruptcy. The approximate amount of debt at the time was 700 million yen.

Games developed
Shin Bakusou Dekotora Densetsu: Tenkatou Icchoujou Kessen (PlayStation 2)
Kousoku Kidoutai: World Super Police (PlayStation 2)
Rhythmic Star! (PlayStation 2)
Kaiketsu Zorori Mezase! Itazura King (PlayStation 2)
Domo-kun no Fushigi Terebi (Nintendo, Game Boy Advance)
F-Zero: GP Legend (Nintendo, Game Boy Advance)
F-Zero: Climax (Nintendo, Game Boy Advance)
Kaiketsu Zorori to Mahou no Yuuenchi Ohimesama wo Sukue! (Game Boy Advance)
Shin Megami Tensei: Devil Children: Puzzle de Call (Game Boy Advance)
Catan (N-Gage)
Zekkyō Senshi Sakeburein (Nintendo, Nintendo DS)
Far East of Eden II: Manji Maru (Nintendo DS)
Wario: Master of Disguise (Nintendo, Nintendo DS)
Boing! Docomodake DS (Nintendo DS)
Dokapon Journey (Nintendo DS)
Umihara Kawase Shun ~second edition~ Kanzenban (Genterprise, Nintendo DS)
Wizardry: Seimei no Setsu (Genterprise, Nintendo DS)

References

Sources 
https://web.archive.org/web/20090106110359/http://games.ign.com/objects/780/780346.html
https://web.archive.org/web/20120723142854/http://www.suzak.co.jp/index2.html
http://www.gamespy.com/company/780/780346.html
https://web.archive.org/web/20120723142915/http://www.suzak.co.jp/works.html
http://www.gamespot.com/pages/company/index.php?company=76717
http://www.gamefaqs.com/features/company/76717.html

External links
 

Amusement companies of Japan
Video game companies established in 2000
Video game companies disestablished in 2012
Defunct video game companies of Japan
Video game development companies
Companies that have filed for bankruptcy in Japan
Japanese companies established in 2000
Japanese companies disestablished in 2012